Eastport may refer to:

Places

Canada
 Eastport, Newfoundland and Labrador, Canada
 Eastport Peninsula, Newfoundland, Canada

United States
 Eastport, Idaho
 Eastport, Maine
 Maritime Republic of Eastport, known as simply Eastport, Annapolis, Maryland
 Eastport, Michigan
 Eastport, Mississippi
 Eastport, New York
 Eastport, Ohio, an unincorporated community

Other uses
 USS Eastport (1862), a steamer
 EastPort UK, a trading name for the Great Yarmouth Port Company
 Piney Point phosphate plant, leased to industrial tenants under the name Eastport

See also